"You Wanna Know" is a single released by British rock band Don Broco.

Release
The single was released on 22 August 2013 and accompanied by a music video which was played by Kerrang! TV to help promote it. In October, the song had charted in the UK Singles Chart, peaking at 39, making it the band's first charting single. Once the single had been released, the EP of the same name was announced the same day and had been up for pre-order.

Critical reception

The EP was well received by critics. Rock Sound praised its catchy-ness and its range of different sounds, from heavy rock of the featured single to the relaxing acoustic songs, and called it a positive successor to Priorities. Electric Banana applauded its very catchy groove with "tongue-in-cheek" lyrics, and stated that it was consistent with their last album. The Guardian called the album's sound a mixture of Busted and Biffy Clyro. The review continued to complement its blend of "snarling power chords and aggressive strobes" along with the lyrics and dynamic screams.

Track listing

Chart performance

References

2013 singles
Don Broco songs
2013 songs
Sony Music singles